Boston is an unincorporated community in Licking County, in the U.S. state of Ohio.

History
Boston was founded around 1832 when a store was established there, and the community sprang up around it.

References

Unincorporated communities in Licking County, Ohio
1832 establishments in Ohio
Populated places established in 1832
Unincorporated communities in Ohio